The 2003 Brasil Open was a men's tennis tournament played on outdoor hard courts in Costa do Sauipe resort, Mata de São João, in Brazil and was part of the International Series of the 2003 ATP Tour. It was the third edition of the tournament and ran from September 8 through September 14, 2003. Sjeng Schalken won the singles title.

Winners

Men's singles

 Sjeng Schalken defeated  Rainer Schüttler 6–2, 6–4
 It was Schalken's 2nd title of the year and the 15th of his career.

Men's doubles

 Todd Perry /  Thomas Shimada defeated  Scott Humphries /  Mark Merklein 6–2, 6–4
 It was Perry's only title of the year and the 1st of his career. It was Shimada's only title of the year and the 3rd of his career.

References

External links
 Official website 
 ATP Tournament Profile

 
Brasil Open